is a Japanese actress, singer, and model. Mizuki is represented by the talent agency Vision Factory. Born in Nerima, Tokyo to Japanese-American parents, Mizuki began modelling for magazines and appearing in commercials at the age of four.

On March 21, 2015, she announced that she married Koji Aoyama, a president of a construction company.

History 
She become a child model in 1980 and first appeared in television series in 1983, but made her official acting debut in 1991, in the Fuji TV drama Mō Dare mo Aisanai. In 1992, Mizuki landed her first leading role in the Fuji TV drama Hōkago. She later starred in the popular series Nurse no Oshigoto, which, after producing four seasons, was also made into a film, Nurse no Oshigoto: The Movie (2002). Mizuki won the Japan Academy Award for Best Newcomer for her performance in Chō Shōjo Reiko (1991) and later earned a Japan Academy Award nomination for Best Actress for her role in Bokunchi (2003).

In May 1991, Mizuki made her singing debut with the song "Densetsu no Shōjo," released through Nippon Columbia. The same year, she earned the Japan Record Award for Best Newcomer. In 1997, Mizuki officially changed the romanization of her first name from Arisa to Alisa. She left Nippon Columbia and signed with her current record label, the Avex Group subsidiary Avex Tune. As of 2011, Mizuki has released twenty-seven singles, six studio albums, and five compilation albums and has sold over 3 million total records. Mizuki is part of the group of artists that were majorly produced by Tetsuya Komuro, commonly known as the TK Family.

Mizuki has starred in several drama series for which she has also sung the theme songs to, such as Help!, Boy Hunt, and most recently Saitō-san. In 2010, Mizuki earned a place in the Guinness World Records book as the only actress to have starred in leading television roles for nineteen consecutive years.

Alongside Rie Miyazawa and Riho Makise, Mizuki was one of the top idols of the 1990s and due to their popularity and ubiquity, the trio were nicknamed "3M" by the media. She is also a successful runway and print model.

Mizuki was the inspiration behind Sailor Moon character Rei Hino, and her song "Kaze mo Sora mo Kitto..." would be used as the ending theme for Sailor Moon Sailor Stars.

Discography

Arisa (1991)
Arisa II: Shake Your Body for Me (1992)
Arisa III: Look (1994)
Cute (1995)
Innocence (1999)
SpeciAlisa (2011)

Filmography

Film 
{| class="wikitable plainrowheaders sortable"
|-
! scope="col" | Title
! scope="col" | Year
! scope="col" | Role
! scope="col" class="unsortable" | Notes
|-
! scope="row" | Chōshōjo Reiko
| 1991
| Reiko Kudō
| Japan Academy Award for Newcomer of the Year
|-
! scope="row" | Shichigatsu Nanoka, Hare
| 1996
| Hinata Mochizuki
| 
|-
! scope="row" | Nurse no Oshigoto: The Movie
| 2002
| Izumi Asakura
| 
|-
! scope="row" | Bokunchi
| 2003
| Kanoko
| Nominated—Japan Academy Award for Best Actress in a Leading Role
|-
! scope="row" | Keep On Rockin'''
| 2003
| 
|
|-
! scope="row" | Tobi ga Kururi to| 2005
| Minako Nakano
| 
|-
! scope="row" | Baby Baby Baby!| 2009
| Yōko Sasaki
| 
|-
! scope="row" | Human Trust| 2013
| Miyuki Takato
|
|-
! scope="row" | Doraemon: Nobita's Space Heroes| 2015
| Meba 
| Voice only
|-
! scope="row" | JoJo's Bizarre Adventure: Diamond Is Unbreakable Chapter I| 2017
| Tomoko Higashikata  
| 
|-
! scope="row" | Daughter of Lupin the Movie| 2021
| Rei Mikumo
| 
|-
! scope="row" | Red Shoes| 2023
| 
| 
|-
|}

 Television 

 Theatre 

 Dubbing Hotel Transylvania 3: Summer Vacation (Ericka Van Helsing)Hotel Transylvania: Transformania'' (Ericka Van Helsing)

References

External links
 
 
 
 

1976 births
20th-century Japanese actresses
21st-century Japanese actresses
Actresses from Tokyo
Avex Group artists
Japanese child actresses
Japanese child singers
Japanese women pop singers
Japanese film actresses
Japanese idols
Japanese people of American descent
Japanese radio personalities
Japanese television actresses
Japanese television personalities
Living people
Nippon Columbia artists
People from Nerima
Singers from Tokyo
20th-century Japanese women singers
20th-century Japanese singers
21st-century Japanese women singers
21st-century Japanese singers